Apshi is a rural locality (a selo) and the administrative centre of Apshinsky Selsoviet, Buynaksky District, Republic of Dagestan, Russia. The population was 1,676 as of 2010. There are 12 streets.

Geography 
Apshi is located 33 km south of Buynaksk (the district's administrative centre) by road. Arykhkent is the nearest rural locality.

References 

Rural localities in Buynaksky District